The Old Exchange & Provost Dungeon, also known as the Custom House, and The Exchange, is a historic building at East Bay and Broad Streets in Charleston, South Carolina. Built in 1767–1771, it has served a variety of civic institutional functions, including notably as a prisoner of war facility operated by British forces during the American Revolutionary War. The building was designated a National Historic Landmark in 1973. It is now a museum operated by the Daughters of the American Revolution.

Description
The Old Exchange is located on the east side of Charleston's historic downtown area, at the northeast corner of East Bay and Broad Streets. It is a two-story masonry building, capped by a hipped roof with cupola and set on a high brick basement. The main facade faces west, and has a projecting three-bay gabled section at its center with entrances recessed in three round-arch openings on the first floor, and sash windows set in bays articulated by Ionic pilasters on the second. The flanking walls each have a Palladian window set on a brick base with balustrade.

History
The Exchange was built from 1767–1771 by South Carolina's provincial government, and was used during the 18th century for a variety of civic functions, including as a custom house, public market, public meeting place, and jail. During the American Revolution, confiscated tea was stored here in 1774, and it is where South Carolina's revolutionary leadership councils were held. After the British captured the city in 1780, it was used as a barracks, and its basement was used as a military prison. In 2012, a study was completed of the building's use as a British prison during the Revolutionary War. Soon after taking control of Charleston in 1780, the British started housing prisoners in the Exchange, but not exclusively in the "dungeon". The investigation was able to document at least 120 prisoners held in the Exchange, but there were many more whose identities could not be discovered. The facility was not exclusively used for Colonial prisoners, and at least some British soldiers were held there too.

The building housed the South Carolina convention to ratify the United States Constitution in 1788, and was the site of many of the events in George Washington's week-long stay in Charleston. He was greeted by a crowd on the balcony. The building continued as an Exchange until the 19th century, when it also became a post office. During the 19th century, the postmaster defended the Exchange's shipment of abolitionist pamphlets from angry Charlestonian rioters. In the American Civil War, the building remained a Confederate post office, but was hit by several shells during the war, and thus abandoned. In 1913, the building was granted to the Daughters of the American Revolution, who have preserved it ever since. In World War I, the building served as the army headquarters of General Leonard Wood and the United States Lighthouse Service—the latter having been in the building since the late 1800s. In World War II, the building not only served as a USO facility and canteen for troops, but served as the Coastal Picket Station for the Sixth Naval District of the United States Coast Guard. In 1965, the Half-Moon Battery, a 1698 fortification, was discovered underneath the building.

The building's first cupola was damaged by a hurricane in the early 1800s. The second deteriorated before the great earthquake of 1886, and the third was not placed until 1981 when the building opened as a museum.

The building is owned by the South Carolina Society of the Daughters of the American Revolution, who operate guided costumed tours that include all three floors of the building. The Provost Dungeon once had animatronic figures that tell stories of pirates and colonial days, but these animatronics have been supplanted by personal dungeon tours by docents.

See also
 List of National Historic Landmarks in South Carolina
 National Register of Historic Places listings in Charleston, South Carolina

References

External links

 Old Exchange and Provost Dungeon museum web site
 Exchange and Provost, Charleston County (E. Bay & Broad Sts., Charleston), including 13 photos, at South Carolina Department of Archives and History
 Historic Charleston's Religious and Community Buildings, a National Park Service Discover Our Shared Heritage Travel Itinerary

National Historic Landmarks in South Carolina
Buildings and structures in Charleston, South Carolina
Government buildings completed in 1767
Museums in Charleston, South Carolina
History museums in South Carolina
Prison museums in the United States
National Register of Historic Places in Charleston, South Carolina
1767 establishments in South Carolina
Historic district contributing properties in South Carolina